The second season of The Real Housewives of Potomac, an American reality television series, is broadcast on Bravo. It premiered on April 2, 2017, and is primarily filmed in Potomac, Maryland. Its executive producers are Steven Weinstock, Glenda Hersh, Lauren Eskelin, Lorraine Haughton-Lawson, Bianca Barnes-Williams, Ashley McFarlin Buie, and Andy Cohen.

The second season of The Real Housewives of Potomac focuses on the lives of Gizelle Bryant, Ashley Darby, Robyn Dixon, Karen Huger, Charrisse Jackson Jordan, and Monique Samuels.

This season marked the final regular appearance of Charrisse Jackson-Jordan.

Cast and synopsis
After the filming for the second season began, Rost was fired from the show. Monique Samuels was then added to the cast for the second season.

Episodes

References

External links

 
 
 

The Real Housewives of Potomac
2017 American television seasons